The Assembly of the Republic is the parliament of the Turkish Republic of Northern Cyprus. It has 50 members, elected for a five-year term by mitigated proportional representation. A party must cross the electoral threshold (5% of the total vote) to be awarded any seats. The parliament is composed of 50 MPs, chosen from six electoral districts, which are coterminous with the districts of Northern Cyprus: Lefkoşa, Gazimağusa, Girne, Güzelyurt, Lefke and İskele.

In Northern Cyprus parliamentary elections, voters vote for individual candidates. There are two ways of voting. 
 Voters can vote for a party, which in effect is voting for every MP candidate from that party in that district once. The voter can further prioritize the MPs in this kind of voting.
 Alternatively, the voter may not choose a party, but vote for candidates from different parties. In this kind of mixed voting, the voter cannot choose more than the number of MPs the district is allotted.

Current composition

 
Parliamentary elections were last held on 23 January 2022. 

Note: Each voter may cast multiple votes, one for each seat in the parliament. Hence, the vote totals may exceed the number of registered voters.

Location
The parliament building is located on Osmanpaşa Caddesi, opposite the Turkish embassy in North Nicosia. The building is a two-storey colonial structure.

Council of Europe assembly representation
In 2004, the Turkish Cypriot community was awarded "observer status" in the Parliamentary Assembly of the Council of Europe (PACE). Since then, the two Turkish Cypriot representatives to PACE are elected by the Assembly of Northern Cyprus.
 
 2005–2007: CTP Özdil Nami; UBP Huseyin Ozgurgun
 27 January 2011: CTP Mehmet Caglar; UBP Ahmet Eti
 4 December 2013: CTP Mehmet Caglar; UBP Tahsin Ertugruloglu

See also
List of speakers of the Assembly of the Republic (Northern Cyprus)

References

External links

 

 

Politics of Northern Cyprus
Government of Northern Cyprus
Northern Cyprus
Northern Cyprus